Abe Deutschendorf (February 12, 1935 – December 23, 2012) was an American politician who 
served in the Oklahoma House of Representatives from 1994 to 2006, as a Democrat representing the Lawton area in District 62. Deutschendorf was author of the first law  giving Oklahomans free access to proposed legislation via the Internet. He was required to vacate his seat in 2006 because of the term limits law.

Before his legislative tenure, he was a longtime educator, serving as the first principal of Eisenhower Junior High School in Lawton. He also served as teacher, coach, counselor and assistant principal at the same school for a total of 25 years.

He was also an uncle of singer John Denver. The singer's birth name was Henry John Deutschendorf Jr.

Deutschendorf died on December 23, 2012.

Notes

1935 births
2012 deaths
Democratic Party members of the Oklahoma House of Representatives